Mohammad Abdul Ahed (11th July 1919 – 1st November 2001) was an architect and painter from Pakistan. He is primarily known for designing the State Bank of Pakistan building in Islamabad and the General Post Office, Karachi.

Books
In February 2010 Sheba Akhtar published an illustrated monograph on Ahed's architectural and artistic work: Of Colour & Form.

Works
 General Post Office, Karachi
 State Bank of Pakistan Building. Islamabad

Awards
 Sitara-i-Khidmat (1971).

References

Pakistani architects
People from Hyderabad State
1919 births
2001 deaths
Pakistani people of Hyderabadi descent